Robert Taft Stephan (January 16, 1933 – January 2, 2023) was an American attorney who served four terms as Kansas Attorney General.

Stephan was born on January 16, 1933, to Taft and Julia Stephan, of Lebanese descent. He graduated from Washburn University School of Law in 1957 and practiced law in Wichita, Kansas. After losing a campaign for local school board, he was appointed a municipal court judge and two years later elected to the district court in Wichita. He first won election as state Attorney General in 1978 and was reelected three times in 1982, 1986, and 1990.

Following the end of his last term, Stephan moved to Lenexa, Kansas, and worked as a consultant in corporate law dealing in consumer protection and Federal Trade Commission regulations.

In 2007, Stephan spoke in support of legalizing medical cannabis in Kansas.

Stephan died on January 2, 2023, two weeks shy of his 90th birthday.

References

1933 births
2023 deaths
American politicians of Lebanese descent
Kansas Attorneys General
Kansas Republicans
Kansas state court judges
Municipal judges in the United States
People from Lenexa, Kansas
Politicians from Wichita, Kansas
Washburn University alumni